Katja Kankaanpää (born June 30, 1981)  is a Finnish former mixed martial artist who competed in the strawweight division. She is currently signed with Invicta FC. Kankaanpää started martial arts training at her teens when she was 15 years old with Goju-ryu karate. Later she had interest about combat sports by training submission wrestling and other combat arts. Katja leads the Nordic (all Skandinavia) strawweight rankings and Finnish women, all weight classes MMA rankings. On January 2, 2015 she was awarded 'Nordic Female Fighter of the Year'. The same month, Finnish sports journalists honored her as 'Sportswoman of 2014', category MMA.
In addition to her career in MMA, the BJJ purple belt competes in submission wrestling and Brazilian jiu-jitsu tournaments. As of September 13, 2015 she retired from MMA.

Mixed martial arts career 
Her debut fight against Paulina Suska at Oulu Fight 2, was won by unanimous decision. In her next three fights versus Dalia Grakulskyte, Niina Aaltonen and Ekaterina Tarnavskaja Kankaanpää was able to achieve an untimely victory by submission or TKO. The next five fights went the whole distance with four unanimous decision wins against Karla Benitez, Mei Yamaguchi, Aisling Daly and Juliana Carneiro Lima. Only against Simona Soukupova she fought to a split draw. On May 17, 2014 Katja returned to the cage at Lappeenranta Fight Night 10 in Finland where she defeated Ukrainian Alyona Rassohyna via submission in round 2. This fight took place outside her InvictaFC contract.

Invicta Fighting Championships 
According to her manager, Kankaanpää took the fight against Daly in Cage Warriors to get Invicta's attention. Kankaanpää was offered a contract with Invicta Fighting Championships immediately after she emerged victorious from the fight with Daly. Invicta initially wanted longer deal, but eventually agreed with Kankaanpää and closed a three-fight contract in early 2013.

She made her first fight for the organisation at Invicta FC 5: Penne vs. Waterson where she defeated Brazilian Juliana Carneiro Lima by unanimous decision. The first defeat of her career Kankaanpää suffered at Invicta FC 7 on December 7, 2013. In a close decision (29:28, 29:28, 29:28), she was defeated by Joanne Calderwood.

On September 6, 2014 Kankaanpää fought for the vacant strawweight title against Stephanie Eggink at Invicta FC 8. She defeated Eggink via submission in round 5 and became the second InvictaFC strawweight Champion. The bout was named "Fight of the Night". On January 17, 2015 Invicta FC announced the prolonging of the contract for 3 more fights.

Katja's first title defense took place at Invicta FC 12: Kankaanpää vs. Souza on April 24, 2015 in Kansas City, Missouri. After dominating the first three rounds, she got caught by Brazilian Lívia Renata Souza in the fourth in a  Triangle choke  and had to tap out.

Kankaanpää fought DeAnna Bennett in Kansas City on September 12 in the co-main event of Invicta FC 14. Kankaanpää lost the fight via controversial unanimous decision and subsequently announced her retirement from MMA the following day.

Championships and accomplishments

Mixed martial arts 
Invicta Fighting Championships
Strawweight Champion (One time)
Fight of the Night (One time) vs. Stephanie Eggink 
Awards
Nordic Female Fighter of the Year 2014
Sportswoman of 2014, category MMA

Personal life 
Katja is married; her maiden name was Katja Kalliokoski. She studied electronic business and is currently working as a media person in charge.

Mixed martial arts record 

|-
| Loss
|align=center| 10–3–1
| DeAnna Bennett
| Decision (unanimous)
|Invicta FC 14: Evinger vs. Kianzad
|
|align=center|3
|align=center|5:00
|Kansas City, Missouri, United States
|
|-
| Loss
|align=center| 10–2–1
| Lívia Renata Souza
| Submission (triangle choke)
|Invicta FC 12: Kankaanpää vs. Souza
|
|align=center|4
|align=center|3:58
|Kansas City, Missouri, United States
|
|-
| Win
|align=center| 10–1–1
| Stephanie Eggink
| Submission (D'Arce choke)
|Invicta FC 8: Waterson vs. Tamada
|
|align=center|5
|align=center|2:03
|Kansas City, Missouri, United States
|
|-
| Win
|align=center| 9–1–1
| Alyona Rassohyna
| Submission (armbar)
|Lappeenranta Fight Night 10
|
|align=center|2
|align=center|0:49
|Lappeenranta, Finland
|
|-
|Loss
|align=center| 8–1–1
|Joanne Calderwood
|Decision (unanimous)
|Invicta FC 7: Honchak vs. Smith
|
|align=center|3
|align=center|5:00
|Kansas City, Missouri, United States
|
|-
| Win
|align=center| 8–0–1
|Juliana Carneiro Lima
| Decision (unanimous)
|Invicta FC 5: Penne vs. Waterson
|April 5, 2013
|align=center|3
|align=center|5:00
|Kansas City, Missouri, United States
|<small>Invicta FC Debut.
|-
| Win
|align=center| 7–0–1
| Aisling Daly
| Decision (unanimous)
|Cage Warriors: 51
|December 31, 2012
|align=center|3
|align=center|5:00
|Dublin, Ireland
|
|-
| Draw
|align=center| 6–0–1
| Simona Soukupova
| Draw (split)
|BP 12 – Botnia Punishment 12
|March 23, 2012
|align=center|3
|align=center|5:00
|Seinäjoki, Finland
|
|-
| Win
|align=center| 6–0
| Mei Yamaguchi
| Decision (unanimous)
|BP 11 – Kankaanpää vs. Yamaguchi
|March 23, 2012
|align=center|3
|align=center|5:00
|Seinäjoki, Finland
|
|-
| Win
|align=center| 5–0
| Karla Benitez
| Decision (unanimous)
|Cage 16 – 1st Defense
|October 8, 2011
|align=center|2
|align=center|5:00
|Espoo, Uusimaa, Finland
|
|-
| Win
|align=center| 4–0
| Ekaterina Tarnavskaja
| Submission (rear-naked choke)
|Cage 15 – Powered by Reezig
|April 29, 2011
|align=center|1
|align=center|2:12
|Espoo, Uusimaa, Finland
|
|-
| Win
|align=center| 3–0
| Niina Aaltonen
| Submission (D'Arce choke)
|BP 9 – Animal Factory
|October 9, 2010
|align=center|2
|align=center|2:12
|Vaasa, Ostrobothnia, Finland
|
|-
| Win
|align=center| 2–0
| Dalia Grakulskyte
| TKO (punches)
|BP Fight Night 2 – Rumble in Amarillo
|April 17, 2010
|align=center|1
|align=center|2:13
|Vaasa, Ostrobothnia, Finland
|
|-
| Win
|align=center| 1–0
| Paulina Suska
| Decision (unanimous)
|OF – Oulu Fight 2
|March 27, 2010
|align=center|2
|align=center|5:00
|Oulu, Northern Ostrobothnia, Finland
|
|-

See also 
 List of female mixed martial artists

References

External links 
 
 Katja Kankaanpää at Invicta FC

1981 births
Living people
Finnish practitioners of Brazilian jiu-jitsu
Female Brazilian jiu-jitsu practitioners
Finnish submission wrestlers
Finnish female karateka
Finnish female mixed martial artists
Strawweight mixed martial artists
Mixed martial artists utilizing Gōjū-ryū
Mixed martial artists utilizing wrestling
Mixed martial artists utilizing Brazilian jiu-jitsu
People from Seinäjoki
Sportspeople from South Ostrobothnia